Urmila Singh or Urmila Bhagat Singh was an indian politician and elected from Barhi constituency as a member of Bharatiya Janata Party as well as Indian National Congress in 2009 and 2019.

References 

Year of birth missing (living people)
Living people
People from Hazaribagh district
Indian National Congress politicians from Jharkhand
Jharkhand MLAs 2009–2014
Jharkhand MLAs 2019–2024
Bharatiya Janata Party politicians from Jharkhand